William Dawes Schulz (born August 14, 1975) is an American journalist, writer, and television personality. Schulz is the host of Mornin'!!! with Bill Schulz and Joanne Nosuchinsky on Compound Media, and is best known for being on the Fox News late-night show Red Eye w/ Greg Gutfield. Schulz is also a freelance writer and a former senior editor of Stuff Magazine.

Early life
Schulz was born William Dawes Schulz in Lake Forest, Illinois. He has two brothers, Alfred and Jonathan, and was raised Catholic. He is a descendant of William Dawes, who rode with Paul Revere in the "Midnight Ride" during the American Revolution. He attended high school in Illinois at Lake Forest Academy, and in 1998 received a BA in Print Journalism from Emerson College.

Career

Red Eye
From its debut in 2007 until November 2013, Schulz was a regular panelist, writer, and producer on "Red Eye with Greg Gutfeld". Serving as host Greg Gutfeld's "repulsive sidekick" who was routinely the target of Gutfeld's running gags, Schulz often looked directly into the camera (even when he was not being talked to) with his signature "crazy-eyed look," along with frequently waving to the television viewing audience. Schulz provided the voice for an anthropomorphism of The New York Times newspaper, named "Pinch" (a reference to publisher Arthur Ochs Sulzberger Jr.).

Schulz's final appearance on Red Eye was on November 7, 2013, and his departure (for undisclosed reasons) was officially announced on November 22.

Mornin'!!!
Schulz currently is the co-host of Mornin'!!! w/ Bill Schulz and Joanne Nosuchinsky, on the Compound Media entertainment network.

Other Ventures
Schulz works as a freelance writer. His articles have appeared in Maxim, The Daily Beast, and The New York Times.

References

External links
 
 

1975 births
Emerson College alumni
Lake Forest Academy alumni
Living people
Writers from Chicago
American television journalists
American male journalists
Dawes family